Chatara Hydropower Station(नेपालीः चतरा जलविद्युत आयोजना) is a canal drop type power station having an installed capacity of 3.2 MW. The power station was commissioned in the year 1996 AD and was handed over to Nepal Electricity Authority by Sunsari Morang Irrigation Project on 29 March 1999. This power station is supplying electricity to local area through Chatara feeder.

The plant was repaired in 2073BS by replacing the turbines.

See also

List of power stations in Nepal

References

Hydroelectric power stations in Nepal
Gravity dams
Run-of-the-river power stations
Dams in Nepal
Irrigation in Nepal
1996 establishments in Nepal
Buildings and structures in Sunsari District